William Bailey (20 July 1898 – 27 February 1983) was an Australian cricketer. He played three first-class cricket matches for Victoria between 1923 and 1927.

He began his cricket career while at Geelong Grammar School, captaining the side by 1917, and then played for the University XI in district cricket where he became known as a dashing batsman. He also became a notable golfer by the mid-1920's.

See also
 List of Victoria first-class cricketers

References

External links
 

1898 births
1983 deaths
Australian cricketers
Victoria cricketers